Percival Albert Gourgaud  (3 October 188130 August 1958) was a senior Australian public servant, best known for his time as head of the Department of Works and Railways.

Life and career
Gourgaud was born on 3 October 1881 at Norton Diggings, near Gladstone, Queensland to parents Claudius Gourgaud and Mary Jane Gourgaud (née Barnes). Claudius had emigrated from France, and Mary Jane from England.

He was appointed Secretary of the Department of Works and Railways in June 1929, his previous position had been chief clerk and assistant secretary in the Department.

The Great Depression restricted public operations, and in 1932 the Works Department was amalgamated with Home Affairs and Transport to form the Department of the Interior, in which he was appointed Assistant Secretary.

Gourgaud retired in 1946, and moved to a house in Moore Street, Turner.

Gourgaud died on 30 August 1958 at Canberra Community Hospital, and was buried in Canberra cemetery.

Awards
Gourgaud was appointed an Officer of the Order of the British Empire in 1937, in recognition of his public service.

References

1881 births
1958 deaths
Australian public servants
Australian Officers of the Order of the British Empire
Australian people of French descent